Alexander Bespalov (born 10 May 1981) is a former Russian racing cyclist.

Palmares

2001
2nd European Under-23 Time Trial Championships
2002
1st Coppa della Pace
2nd European Under-23 Time Trial Championships
2nd UCI Under-23 World Time Trial Championships
3rd Giro delle Regioni
2003
2nd National Time Trial Championships
3rd UCI Under-23 World Time Trial Championships
2004
 World Military Time Trial Champion
 National Time Trial Champion
2005
2nd National Time Trial Championships
2006
 National Time Trial Champion
2nd Chrono Champenois
2007
3rd National Time Trial Championships

References

1981 births
Living people
Russian male cyclists
People from Naberezhnye Chelny
Sportspeople from Tatarstan